Kapp Dufferin is a spit located northeast in Heer Land on the island of Spitsbergen in Svalbard, Norway. It is named for Frederick Hamilton-Temple-Blackwood, 1st Marquess of Dufferin and Ava, who visited Svalbard in 1856 and wrote Letters From High Latitudes.

References

Headlands of Spitsbergen